Panther is a Commodore 64 game designed and implemented by Peter Adams and published by Mastertronic in 1986. An Atari 8-bit family version followed in 1987, then a ZX Spectrum port in 1989. The player pilots a strange-looking aircraft, fighting off hordes of invading flying saucers and rescuing people by landing the craft and waiting for them to board. The game uses a diagonally scrolling isometric view, much like Zaxxon and Blue Max, using shadows to show the height of flying objects. Adams previously worked ports of both of those games.

The Commodore 64 disk packaged Panther with L.A. SWAT, another Mastertronic game. The A-side of the disk contained the two programs for the C64/128, while the B-side contained Atari 8-bit family versions.

Gameplay

In Panther the player needs to pilot their craft across the landscape, shoot up the invaders and rescue survivors. To do this, the player has to land close to the bunkers as they appear on the screen and stay there until all the refugees reach the player's ship. At the end of each run, a capsule awaits to take refugees to safety. The aliens attack in waves, and the player's onboard computer indicates at the bottom of the screen the position of incoming units relative to the player's ship, as well as the number of shields remaining. The goal of the game is to achieve the highest possible score by rescuing as many people as possible.

Reception
Panther received mostly positive reviews. Ruth James writing for Atari User enjoyed the game despite minor faults and concluded: "you must buy this game for your collection, it's well worth it". Zzap!64 review was also positive, with reviewers stating that the game provides several hours of entertainment as the player tries to collect and deliver all the survivors. Commodore User review was similar in tone and gave the game an overall rating of 7/10.

References

External links

Panther at Atari Mania

1986 video games
Alien invasions in video games
Atari 8-bit family games
Commodore 64 games
ZX Spectrum games
Video games scored by David Whittaker
Video games set on fictional planets
Video games developed in the United States
Video games with isometric graphics
Mastertronic games